David Allen Hickling (May 29, 1934 - Dec 18, 2022), known as Allen Hickling, was an Architect, Planning/Strategic Choice Process consultant, author, game designer, and an authority in the field of toy forts and castles.

Early life 
Hickling was born in Sutton Coldfield, Warwickshire, UK, and spent his childhood years in Cheltenham, Gloucestershire, and Budleigh Salterton, South Devon.

In 1959, Hickling received a Diploma of Architecture from The Royal West of England Academy School of Architecture (RWA) in Bristol, UK. In 1970, he received a master's degree in City Planning (MCP) as well as a master's degree in Architecture (MArch) from the Urban Design graduate program at the University of Pennsylvania.

Career

Architect 
In 1959 Hickling moved from the UK to Montréal, Canada, where he lived for 9 years. He joined the architectural firm Van Ginkel Associates as Chef de Bureau, working on the development of Downtown Montreal and Meadowvale, Ontario, a new town community for the newly incorporated City of Mississauga. In 1963 Hickling joined Mayerovitch & Bernstein as project architect on one of the interconnected buildings that make up Montreal's Underground City, a development linking offices, retail space, hotels and residential complexes to the city's entirely subterranean mass transit system—the Montreal Metro. During his time in Canada, he was also part of the small team that designed the Circuit Mont-Tremblant (race track).

Planning and Strategic Choice 
From 1971 to 1980 Hickling worked at the Institute of Operational Research (IOR), a unit of the Tavistock Institute of Human Relations, as a Senior Research Scientist. During his time at IOR, he was instrumental in developing the use of Strategic Choice Theory (a dynamic socio-technical approach to planning and decision making) to help diverse groups experiencing multi-faceted challenges reach consensus. In 1979 Hickling presented a paper titled Using Strategic Choice as a Framework for Communication at a one-day event, OR, Social Science, and Strategic Choice, held at the Royal Society, London, led by the Operational Research Society.

In the 1980s Hickling's work became closely linked to environmental policy and planning, which led him to set up his consultancy firm; Allen Hickling and Associates. The company collaborated with an international network of specialists working on the processes of planning, conflict resolution, and strategic choice, while providing services in action research, training, and facilitation. Hickling was employed by the Environment Directorates of the Dutch, German, French, Italian, Latvian, Estonian, Hungarian and British Governments, the OECD, and the European Commission, to facilitate the solving of complex problems at the highest levels by enabling politicians, professionals, managers, industry representatives, and special interest groups to work together interactively.

Hickling was also heavily involved in the private sector, working for large and small companies including British Nuclear Fuels, Direct Rail Services, IBM, Cable and Wireless, Shell, Thames Water, EBRD, and Hamersley Iron.

Hickling was a founding member of the Environmental Resolve Committee, through which he worked with the Environment Council in London. As a leading member of The Environment Council's facilitation team, he designed their consensus-building program and played a central role in developing their facilitation and mediation training program.

Writer 
Hickling was a well-known lecturer and authored 8 books, including the best-selling Planning Under Pressure: The Strategic Choice Approach, which provides planners, consultants, managers and students with practical ways to approach complex decision making. The SCA (Strategic Choice Approach) process is also implemented in a software tool called STRAD (Strategic Advisor). In addition, Hickling wrote numerous papers and made many contributions to books and journals on the subject of planning and strategic choice.

RPG Game Design 
In the 1980s Hickling set up Endless Games, and partnered in Integrated Games. Both companies designed and produced add-on products for Fantasy Role-playing games (FRP) such as Dungeons & Dragons (D&D) and RuneQuest.

Toy Forts and Castles 
Hickling was an authority on the subject of toy forts and castles and spent 30 years researching the subject. He amassed one of the largest collections of toy forts and castles in the world - half of which now resides in a museum in Cyprus. He wrote numerous articles in journals such as Toy Soldier Parade, Old Toy Soldier, and Plastic Warrior. Hickling wrote the only reference book on the subject; Toy Forts and Castles: European-Made Toys of the 19th and 20th Centuries.

Car racing 
Hickling raced Production Sports Cars (TVR and Ginetta Cars) from 1962 to 1967 in Canada and the U.S., during which time he was a National Instructor with the Canadian Automobile Sport Clubs In 1965 he won his class in the Quebec Championship, and in 1966 he did it again coming third overall.

Cricket 
Hickling had a lifelong passion for the sport of Cricket. He served as president of the Long Itchington Cricket Club, of which he was one of the founding fathers in 1976. He was a qualified Umpire and Senior Coach with the England and Wales Cricket Board (Association of Cricket Officials) and (Coaches Association).

Personal life 
He was married to Judith Hickling, his wife of 58 years, and had 4 children. He lived in the village of Long Itchington, Warwickshire, England, for 52 years.

Hickling was fluent in Dutch, which he learned with the Nuns of Vught, at the Regina Coeli Language Institute in The Netherlands.

Works and publications

Books

Book Contributions 
 Hickling, Allen; Sutton, Alan (1975). "Planning as a Process of Strategic Choice". In: IFHP. Papers and Prcoeedings, International Congress,  Amsterdam, pp. 49–69.
 Hickling, Allen; Friend, John; Luckman, John (1979). "An Analytical Framework for Inter-Organisational Coordination". In: Holm, Per. Research into Local Planning Processes, pp. 157–182. Swedish Council for Building Research, Stockholm. .
 Hickling, Allen (1982). "Beyond a Linear Iterative Process?" In: Evans, Barrie; Powell, James; Talbot, Reg. Changing Design, pp. 275–293.  John Wiiley & Sons, Chichester, UK.
 Hicklng, Allen (1985). "Evaluation is a Five Finger Exercise". In: Faludi, Andreas; Voogd, Henk. Evaluation of Complex Policy Problems, pp125–134. Delftsche Uitgevers, Delft, The Netherlands. .
 
 Breure, Abraham; Hickling, Allen (1990). "Coping with Unconventional Projects: a 'Socio-Technical' Approach". In: Gareis, Roland. Handbook of Management Projects pp. 347–355. Manzsche Verlag, Vienna, Austria.
 Hickling, Allen (1990). Decision Spaces': A Scenario about Designing Appropriate Rooms for Decision Management". In: Eden, Colin; Radford, Jim. Tackling Strategic Problems, pp. 169–177. Sage Publications, London. .
 Hicking, Allen; (2001). "Gambling with Frozen Fire?" In: Rosenhead, Jonathan; Mingers, John. Rational Analysis for a Problematic World Revisited.  pp. 151–180. John Wiley & Sons, Chichester, England. .

Journals

References

External links 
 Allen Hickling

English writers
Toy collecting
British game designers
Architects from Warwickshire
People from Sutton Coldfield
University of Pennsylvania School of Design alumni
Living people
1934 births